Jessy Deminguet (born 7 January 1998) is a French professional footballer who plays as a midfielder for Ligue 2 club Caen.

Professional career
A member of the SM Caen youth academy since 2009, Deminguet started training with the first team in September 2017. Deminguet made his professional debut for SM Caen in a 5-0 Ligue 1 loss to Olympique Marseille on 5 November 2017.

International career
Deminguet received a call-up to represent the France national under-20 football team for the 2018 Toulon Tournament on 17 May 2018.

Personal life
Deminguet was born in Lisieux, and is of Norman descent. Jessy is one of 11 siblings, and his father was a former footballer.

Career statistics

Club
(Correct as of 21 April 2018)

References

External links
 
 
 
 SM Caen Profile
 

1998 births
Living people
People from Lisieux
French footballers
France youth international footballers
French people of Norman descent
Association football midfielders
Stade Malherbe Caen players
Ligue 1 players
Sportspeople from Calvados (department)
Footballers from Normandy